Live! Shelly Manne & His Men at the Manne-Hole is a live double-album by drummer Shelly Manne's group Shelly Manne & His Men, recorded at Shelly's Manne-Hole in Hollywood, California, in 1961 and released on the Contemporary label. The album was re-released on two separate CDs in 1991 as Volume 1 and Volume 2.

Reception

The AllMusic review by Scott Yanow states: "Shelly Manne & His Men are heard in prime form performing live at their home base, Shelly's Manne-Hole. Trumpeter Conte Candoli was in particularly strong form throughout the stint, showing self-restraint yet playing with power. ... This classic music falls between cool jazz and hard bop".

Track listing
Volume 1
 "Love for Sale" (Cole Porter)10:29
 "How Could It Happen to a Dream?" (Duke Ellington, Johnny Hodges, Don George)6:50
 "Softly, as in a Morning Sunrise" (Sigmund Romberg, Oscar Hammerstein II)8:59
 "The Champ" (Dizzy Gillespie)10:55 
Volume 2
 "On Green Dolphin Street" (Bronisław Kaper, Ned Washington)13:00
 "What's New?" (Bob Haggart, Johnny Burke)6:47
 "If I Were a Bell" (Frank Loesser)12:17
 "Ev'ry Time We Say Goodbye" (Porter)4:25
 "A Gem from Tiffany" (Bill Holman)2:35

Personnel
Shelly Mannedrums
Conte Candolitrumpet
Richie Kamucatenor saxophone
Russ Freemanpiano
Chuck Berghoferbass

References

1961 live albums
Contemporary Records live albums
Shelly Manne live albums
Albums recorded at Shelly's Manne-Hole